The British Informatics Olympiad (BIO) is an annual computer-programming competition for secondary and sixth-form students. Any student under 19 who is in full-time pre-university education and resident in mainland Britain is eligible to compete. The competition is composed of two rounds - a preliminary 3-question, 3-hour exam paper sat at the participant's school and a final round. The top-15 performing students each year are invited to the finals (currently hosted by Trinity College, Cambridge) where they attempt to solve several more difficult problems, some written, some involving programming. Typically a score of 70 to 80 out of 100 is required on the first round of the competition to reach the final.

Of these fifteen, four are chosen for the British team, and one or two are chosen as reserves. This team goes on to represent Britain in the International Olympiad in Informatics in the summer of that year.

Mark schemes are available for all past papers at the competition's official site. Official worked solutions are available for papers 1995-1999 and 2004, whilst unofficial solutions are available for papers 2009-2014.

Sponsors 
The BIO has been sponsored by video-games developer Lionhead Studios since 2002.
In the past, it has also been sponsored by Data Connection.

See also
 Young Scientists of the Year

References

External links
BIO Official Website

Annual events in the United Kingdom
Competitions in the United Kingdom
Computer science education in the United Kingdom
Programming contests